Tirnavia is a mixed choir from Slovakia founded in 1988, on the occasion of the 750th anniversary of Trnava being granted free royal town privileges. The choir was founded by Gabriel Kalapoš. Following conductors were Andrej Rapant and Zuzana Holičková. Current conductor is Michal Stahl. Tirnavia's name is derived from the historical name of Trnava and Tirnavia confirms the rich tradition of choral singing in this town. The choir members are mostly students of universities.

The choir repertoire includes compositions from the renaissance until present times. It also includes adaptations of Slovak folk songs, Christmas carols and Spirituals. Tirnavia organizes approximately 20 concerts a year at home as well as abroad. Tirnavia has recorded three CDs - the first one (1997) together with the choir Cantica Nova also from Trnava, and the second one focusing on the 20th century Slovak choral music (2004). In 2007 the new Christmas CD "Christmas with Tirnavia" was released. The choir Tirnavia cooperates occasionally with "Trnavský komorný orchester" (The Chamber Orchestra of Trnava). They have performed the Messiah of Händel and Gloria of Vivaldi together. The choir performed the Solemn Mass (for 2 organs and mixed choir) by Louis Vierne together with well known organist David di Fiore (USA) in October 2004. Tirnavia regularly takes part in competitions of choral singing in Slovakia and abroad.
 
The most important choir events from the last few years:

3rd place at the international competition Grand Prix Slovakia in Trenčianske Teplice 2001, Slovakia,
3rd place at the worldwide competition International Eisteddfod Llangollen 2002, Wales,
4th place at the international competition in Montreux Choral Festival 2003, Switzerland, 
1st place in the golden level in the category of folklore and 2nd place in the golden level in the category of mixed choirs at the International Festival of Academic Choirs (IFAS) 2004 in Pardubice, Czech Republic,
2nd place in the category "choral musicof 5 centuries" and 3rd place in the category of folklore, spiritual and jazz at the 6.International Choral Competition 2006 in Miltenberg, Germany

In 2005 Tirnavia took part in an international workshop in Gliwice (Poland) where they performed two Psalms of Mendelssohn, realised two trips in Austria, where they sang in the summer festival in Lillienfeld and the Christmas concert in Vienna town hall.

References

External links
 The Mixed choir TIRNAVIA, Slovakia

Slovak choirs
A cappella musical groups
Musical groups established in 1988
1988 establishments in Czechoslovakia